West New York School District is a public school district serving students in pre-kindergarten through twelfth grade in West New York, in Hudson County, New Jersey, United States. The district is one of 31 former Abbott districts statewide that were established pursuant to the decision by the New Jersey Supreme Court in Abbott v. Burke which are now referred to as "SDA Districts" based on the requirement for the state to cover all costs for school building and renovation projects in these districts under the supervision of the New Jersey Schools Development Authority.
As of the 2018–19 school year, the district, comprised of nine schools, had an enrollment of 8,498 students and 595.0 classroom teachers (on an FTE basis), for a student–teacher ratio of 14.3:1.

The district is classified by the New Jersey Department of Education as being in District Factor Group "A", the lowest of eight groupings. District Factor Groups organize districts statewide to allow comparison by common socioeconomic characteristics of the local districts. From lowest socioeconomic status to highest, the categories are A, B, CD, DE, FG, GH, I and J.

Schools
Schools in the district (with 2018–19 enrollment data from the National Center for Education Statistics) are:
Early Childhood School with 499 students in PreK
Elementary schools
Public School #1 with 834 students in grades K-6
Public School #2 with 736 students in grades K-6
Robert Menendez Elementary School (School #3) with 599 students in grades K-6
Albio Sires Elementary School (School #4) with 685 students in grades K-6
Public School #5 with 692 students in grades K-6
Harry L. Bain Elementary School (School #6) with 661 students in grades K-6
Middle school
West New York Middle School with 1,056 students in grades 7-8
High school
Memorial High School with 2,034 students in grades 9-12

Administration
Core members of the district's administration are:
Clara Brito Herrera, Superintendent
Dean Austin, Business Administrator / Board Secretary

Board of education
The district's board of education, comprised of nine members, sets policy and oversees the fiscal and educational operation of the district through its administration. As a Type II school district, the board's trustees are elected directly by voters to serve three-year terms of office on a staggered basis, with three seats up for election each year held (since 2014) as part of the November general election. The board appoints a superintendent to oversee the district's day-to-day operations and a business administrator to supervise the business functions of the district.

References

External links

 West New York School District

Data for the West New York School District, National Center for Education Statistics

New Jersey Abbott Districts
New Jersey District Factor Group A
School districts in Hudson County, New Jersey
West New York, New Jersey